Christopher Penman (born 12 September 1945) is an English former footballer who made 30 appearances in the Football League playing as a goalkeeper for Darlington in the 1960s. He was on the books of Preston North End, but never represented them in the League, and went on to play non-league football for South Shields. When he was only 18 years old, he was in goal as Darlington suffered what remained their record Football League defeat, 10–0 at Doncaster Rovers in the Fourth Division.

References

1945 births
Living people
People from Houghton-le-Spring
Footballers from Tyne and Wear
English footballers
Association football goalkeepers
Preston North End F.C. players
Darlington F.C. players
South Shields F.C. (1936) players
English Football League players